The Furtbek is a stream in Hamburg in the outer north-east of the city.

Geography
The stream begins at the street of Volksdorfer Damm in the Hamburg quarter of Bergstedt. It then flows westward and joins the Saselbek stream near the nature reserve of Hainesch/Iland, above the Old Mill. The stream name refers to a ford (Furt-) and a small stream (-bek).

In the lower reaches, the Furtbek has steep banks. Occasionally a kingfisher can be seen there hunting.

Renaturation projects are carried out at some parts of the stream.

References

Rivers of Hamburg
Wandsbek
Rivers of Germany